Supachai Komsilp (born February 18, 1980) simply known as Boy, is a retired professional footballer from Thailand. He is the currently first-team coach Thai League 1 club of BG Pathum United.

International career
Supachai was called up to the national team, in coach Winfried Schäfer first squad selection for the  2014 FIFA World Cup qualification.

Honours

Clubs
Bangkok Glass
 Thai FA Cup 
Winner (1) : 2014
 Singapore Cup 
Winner (1): 2010

References

External links
 Profile at Goal
 

1980 births
Living people
Supachai Komsilp
Supachai Komsilp
Association football fullbacks
Supachai Komsilp
Supachai Komsilp
Supachai Komsilp
Supachai Komsilp
Supachai Komsilp
2004 AFC Asian Cup players